The Croydon North by-election was a by-election for the Parliament of the United Kingdom's House of Commons constituency of Croydon North in the London Borough of Croydon.  The by-election was caused by the death of its Member of Parliament Malcolm Wicks. It took place on Thursday, 29 November, the same day as by-elections in Middlesbrough and Rotherham. The by-election was won by Steve Reed of the Labour Party.

Boundaries
The constituency covers the north west of the London Borough of Croydon and includes Thornton Heath, Norbury, Selhurst and parts of South and Upper Norwood.  It is made up of eight electoral wards from the borough:
Bensham Manor, Broad Green, Norbury, Selhurst, South Norwood, Thornton Heath, Upper Norwood, and West Thornton

Croydon's three constituencies are contiguous with the boundaries of the London Borough of Croydon. Croydon North borders the seats of Carshalton and Wallington, Mitcham and Morden, Streatham, Dulwich and West Norwood, Lewisham West and Penge, Beckenham, Croydon Central, and Croydon South.

Result

Croydon Borough Council released the statement of persons nominated on 14 November. This confirmed 12 candidates will contest the election. The electorate is said to be around 104,000

On 3 November 2012, former children's book publisher and current Leader of London Borough of Lambeth Council, Councillor Steve Reed was chosen to be the Labour candidate after a closely fought battle with London Assembly member Val Shawcross.

Charity worker and social entrepreneur Andrew Stranack, who has cerebral palsy, was the Conservative party candidate.

On 17 October 2012, IT professional and former London Borough of Islington Councillor Marisha Ray was selected as the prospective Liberal Democrats candidate.

On 25 October, the Green Party chose local campaigner Shasha Khan, dubbed by local reporters as 'Croydon's Green Knight'

Winston McKenzie, a perennial election candidate who was the UKIP candidate in Tottenham, an independent candidate at the 2003 Brent East by-election, Veritas Party nominee at Croydon North in 2005 and independent candidate for London Mayor has been chosen as the prospective candidate for the UK Independence Party.

On 29 October, the Chair of the London Race and Criminal Justice Consortium and a former Senior Policy Advisor to the then Mayor of London Ken Livingstone, Lee Jasper, was selected as the candidate for the Respect Party.

On 17 October, The National Front confirmed their prospective candidate to be the former British National Party Deputy Chairman and engineer Richard Edmonds.

Previous result

See also
1940 Croydon North by-election
1948 Croydon North by-election
List of United Kingdom by-elections
Opinion polling for the 2015 United Kingdom general election

References

November 2012 events in the United Kingdom
2012 elections in the United Kingdom
2012 in London
By-elections to the Parliament of the United Kingdom in London constituencies
Elections in the London Borough of Croydon